The Superiors are a father-son record production and songwriting duo from Wyandanch, New York, consisting of Sidney "S.I.D." Reynolds and Javon "Von" Reynolds. The duo has produced for notable hip-hop artists, such as Rod Wave, Lil Durk, and Polo G, with the single "Wishing for a Hero" being certified Gold by the RIAA.

History
Sidney grew up in Wyandanch, New York where he met Rakim and got him influenced unto the music business. In the early '90s, he was already famous for remixing, writing, and producing on albums for Freddie Foxxx, Slick Rick, Color Me Badd, Nikki D, Zhane, and Queen Latifah. Ever since his son (Javon) was five years old, he taught him how to play the guitar, piano, drums, and Logic Pro, so music was all he knew growing up.

Production discography

2012 
Lloyd Banks - V.6: The Gift

 03. "The Sprint"

Trav - PUSH

 "Presidential" (featuring Jim Jones and Lloyd Banks)

2013 
Hustle Gang - Hustle Gang Presents: G.D.O.D. (Get Dough Or Die)

 02. "Err Body" (featuring T.I., Young Dro, Trae Tha Truth, Chip, B.o.B., and Shad da God)

2014 
SchylerChaise - "Just Us" (featuring Jimmy Kelso and Rick Ross)

Chinx - I'll Take It from Here - EP

 04. "No Way Out"
Hustle Gang - G.D.O.D. II

 11. "I Do The Most" (featuring Yung Booke, T.I., Young Dro, Spodee, and Shad da God)

Fabolous - The Young OG Project
03. "All Good" (co-produced with Detrakz)
05. "She Wildin'" (featuring Chris Brown)

2016 

French Montana - MC4
14. "Chinx & Max / Paid For" (featuring Max B & Chinx) (co-produced with LJ Milan, Rick Steel, Harry Fraud and The Alchemist)

2018 

Blackway - Good.Bad.Faded
02. "KIST"
04. "Bourbon Street" (co-produced with Studio Pirates)

2019 
Polo G - Die a Legend

 01. "Lost Files (co-produced with Detrakz and Priority Beats)

2020 

Polo G - THE GOAT
16. "Wishing for a Hero" (featuring BJ the Chicago Kid) (additional production by Priority Beats and Jeff Gitty)

Various Artists - Insecure: Music From The HBO Original Series, Season 4

12. “Element” by PJ

Stunna 4 Vegas - Welcome to 4 Vegas
05. "Gangsta Party" (co-produced with Priority Beats)
Lil Durk - The Voice

 15. "Lamborghini Mirrors" (featuring Booka600) (co-produced with Joe Leytrick, Jay Lv, and TouchofTrent)

2021 
Sage The Gemini & Chris Brown - Baby

Fredo Bang - Murder Made Me

 06. "Click Up" (co-produced with DKeyz, Figurez Made It, ProdbyBlack & Dremar Banks)

Rod Wave - SoulFly (Deluxe)

 07. "Time Heals" (co-produced with DKeyz, MarsGawd & MalikOTB)

References

External links

African-American musical groups
American hip hop groups
American hip hop record producers
American musical duos
Contemporary R&B duos
Hip hop duos
Record production duos
Musical groups established in 2011
Musical groups from Long Island
American songwriting teams
2011 establishments in New York (state)